Men's 1500m races for athletes with cerebral palsy at the 2004 Summer Paralympics were held in the Athens Olympic Stadium on 20 & 26 September. Events were held in two disability classes, each running a single race.

T36

The T36 event consisted of a single race. It was won by Artem Arefyev, representing .

Final Round
26 September 2004, 19:30

T37

The T37 event consisted of a single race. It was won by Mohamed Charmi, representing .

Final Round
20 September 2004, 19:45

References

M